Roberto Monteiro Gurgel Santos (born September 24, 1954, Fortaleza) is a former Prosecutor General of the Republic.

References

Gurgel was Attorney General.

External links
Biography of Roberto Gurgel - Procuradoria Geral da República

|-

1954 births
Living people
Prosecutors General of the Republic (Brazil)
Election people
People from Fortaleza
Federal University of Rio de Janeiro alumni